Matej is a given name that originates from the Slavic nations of Central and Eastern Europe. It is one of the most common male names in Slovakia and Slovenia, and is also common in Croatia. The name is originally derived from Matthias the Apostle.

Matěj, with the ě diacritic, is a Czech given name. In Polish the equivalent is Maciej, and in English it's Matthew. Apoštol Matěj is Matthias the Apostle, while Matthew the Apostle is Matouš in Czech.

Matej
Notable people with the name include:

A-I
 Matej Bagarić (born 1989), Croatian footballer
 Matej Bene (born 1992), Slovak ice hockey player
 Matej Beňuš (born 1987), Slovak slalom canoeist 
 Matej Bor (1913–1993), Slovene poet, translator, playwright, journalist and partisan
 Matej Centrih (born 1988), Slovenian football player
 Matej Černič (born 1978), Italian volleyball player
 Matej Češík (born 1988), Slovak ice hockey player
 Matej Cigale (1819–1889), Slovene lawyer, linguist, and editor
 Matej Čurko (1968-2011), Slovak serial killer
 Matej Delač (born 1992), Croatian football goalkeeper 
 Matej Falat (born 1993), Slovak alpine skier 
 Matej Ferjan (1977–2011), Slovenian motorcycle speedway rider 
 Matej Gaber (born 1991), Slovenian handball player 
 Matej Gnezda (born 1979), Slovenian racing cyclist 
 Matej Gorelka (born 1989), Slovak football striker 
 Matej Grešák, Slovak footballer
 Matej Hliničan (born 1994), Slovak badminton player 
 Matej Hočevar (born 1982), Slovenian ice hockey player
 Matej Hradecky (born 1995), Finnish football player 
 Matej Ižvolt (born 1986), Slovak footballer

J-N
 Matej Jakúbek, Slovak footballer
 Matej Jelić (born 1990), Croatian football forward
 Matej Jonjić (born 1991), Croatian football player
 Matej Jug (born 1980), Slovenian international football referee
 Matej Juhart (born 1976), German bobsledder
 Matej Jurčo (born 1984), Slovak road bicycle racer
 Matej Kazár (born 1983), Slovak biathlete
 Matej Kocak (1882–1918) United States Marine Corps sergeant
 Matej Kochan (born 1992), Slovak football midfielder
 Matej Kopecký (born 1990), Slovak football goalkeeper
 Matej Kosorín (born 1997), Slovak footballer
 Matej Kováč (born 1985), Slovak football midfielder
 Matej Krajčík (born 1978), Slovak footballer
 Matej Král (born 1990), Slovak football midfielder
 Matej Kristín (born 1990), Slovakian ice hockey goaltender
 Matej Krušič (born 1987), Slovenian basketball player
 Matej Kubš (born 1988), Slovak volleyball player
 Matej Mamić (born 1975), Croatian basketball player
 Matej Marin (born 1980), Slovenian racing cyclist
 Matej Mavrič (born 1979), Slovenian footballer
 Matej Mészáros (born 1982), Slovak sport shooter
 Matej Mináč (born 1961), Slovak film director
 Matej Mitrović (born 1993), Croatian football defender
 Matej Mohorič (born 1994), Slovene road racing cyclist
 Matej Mugerli (born 1981), Slovenian road bicycle racer
 Matej Náther (born 1985), Slovak football midfielder
 Matej Ninoslav (died 1250), Ban of Bosnia

O-Z
 Matej Oravec (born 1998), Slovak footballer
 Matej Palčič (born 1993), Slovenian footballer
 Matej Paták (born 1990), Slovak volleyball player
 Matej Peternel (born 1992), Slovenian football midfielder 
 Matej Podlogar (born 1991), Slovenian football player 
 Matej Podstavek (born 1991), Slovak football defender 
 Matej Poplatnik (born 1992), Slovenian footballer
 Matej Prelog (born 1980), Slovenian rower
 Matej Pučko (born 1993), Slovenian footballer
 Matej Radan (born 1990), Slovenian football goalkeeper 
 Matej Rakovan (born 1990), Slovak football goalkeeper 
 Matej Rapnik (born 1990), Slovenian football centre-back 
 Matej Rehák (born 1990), Slovak football right back
 Matej Rojc (born 1993), Slovenian professional basketball player
 Matej Šavol (born 1984), Slovak football goalkeeper 
 Matej Šebenik (born 1983), Slovene chess player 
 Matej Siva (born 1984), Slovak football defender 
 Matej Sivrić (born 1989), Croatian football forward 
 Matej Slávik (born 1994), Slovak football goalkeeper 
 Matej Šnofl (born 1977), Slovenian football defender 
 Matej Stare (born 1978), Slovenian racing cyclist 
 Matej Sternen (1870–1949), Slovene Impressionist painter
 Matej Strapák (born 1993), Slovak footballer
 Matej Székely (born 1991), Slovak football goalkeeper 
 Matej Tóth (born 1983), Slovak race walker
 Matej Vidović (born 1993), Croatian alpine skier
 Matej Andraž Vogrinčič (born 1970), Slovenian artist
 Matej Žagar (born 1983), Slovenian motorcycle speedway rider
 Matej Zatlkaj, Slovak Magic: The Gathering player and commentator

Matěj
Matěj is a Czech given name. Notable people with the name include:	
  
 Matěj Beran (born 1993), Czech ice hockey player
 Matěj Chaluš (born 1998), Czech football centre-back
 Matěj Hádek (born 1975), Czech actor
 Matěj Hanousek (born 1993), Czech footballer
 Matěj Helešic (born 1996), Czech football defender
 Matěj Hybš (born 1993), Czech football player
 Matěj Končal (born 1993), Czech football player
 Matěj Kopecký (1775–1847), Czech puppeteer
 Matěj Kůs (born 1989), Czech motorcycle speedway rider
 Matěj Kvíčala (born 1989), Czech luger
 Matěj Lasák (born 1992), Czech cyclo-cross cyclist
 Matěj Machovský (born 1993), Czech ice hockey player
 Matěj Marič (born 1991), Czech football player
 Matěj Novák (born 1989), Czech ice dancer
 Matěj Paprčiak (born 1991), Czech football player
 Matěj Psota (born 1994), Czech ice hockey player
 Matěj Pulkrab (born 1997), Czech football striker
 Matěj Rejsek (c. 1445–1506), Czech stonemason, sculptor, builder and architect
 Matěj Sebera (born 2001), Czech ice hockey player
 Matěj Štochl (born 1989), Czech football player
 Matěj Stříteský (born 1990), Czech ice hockey defenceman
 Matěj Stropnický (born 1983), Czech politician
 Matěj Trojovský (born 1984), Czech ice hockey defenceman
 Matěj Vydra (born 1992), Czech football striker

See also
 
 Mate (given name)
 Matija
 Mateja

Czech masculine given names
Slovak masculine given names
Slovene masculine given names
Croatian masculine given names